Liontrust Asset Management plc is a British asset management company based in London. It is listed on the London Stock Exchange and is a constituent of the FTSE 250 Index.

History
The company, which was established in 1995, was the subject of an initial public offering on the London Stock Exchange in 1999. It acquired Alliance Trust Investment Management in December 2016 and bought Neptune Investment Management in October 2019. After incurring an outflow of £0.5 billion, the company created a new investment management team in July 2022.

References

External links
Official site

1995 establishments in England
Companies based in London